Nicias of Nicaea, was a biographer and historian of ancient Greek philosophers. Nothing is known about his life, he may have lived in the 1st century BC or AD. He is repeatedly referred to by Athenaeus. His principal work seems to have been a Successions, a history of the various schools of philosophy. Athenaeus also mentions a work On the Philosophers, A third work, a History of Arcadia is also referred to, but whether it is by this Nicias is unclear.

Notes

1st-century BC Greek people
1st-century Greek people
1st-century BC historians
1st-century historians
Ancient Greek biographers
Greek-language historians from the Roman Empire
People from Bithynia
Historians from Roman Anatolia